Volodar Rostyslavych, Volodar Rostislavich (died 1124) was Prince of Zvenyhorod (1085–92) and Peremyshl' (1092–97).

He actively was involved in the Polish internal affairs. Volodar also waged a war against the Grand Prince of Kiev Sviatopolk II of Kiev and his son Yaroslav. In 1121 Volodar was imprisoned in Poland, but was bonded out by his brother Vasylko Rostyslavych.

Together with Vasylko participated at the federal council in Liubech in 1097 (see Council of Liubech).

His father was Rostislav of Tmutarakan; his son was Volodymyrko of Halych, father of Yaroslav Osmomysl.

Today there is confusion between two localities of former Zvenyhorod city, one being located in Lviv Raion in Lviv Oblast  and another in Chortkiv Raion in Ternopil Oblast. The map on the left shows one east of Halych (pol. Halicz), which is one in the Ternopil Oblast, while the official Ukrainian historiography claims the one near Lviv, which would be located north of Halych.

Military campaigns
 against Kyiv in 1099 (near Zolochiv)
 against Hungary in 1099 (near Peremyshl)

External links
 Volodar Rostyslavych in the Internet Encyclopedia of Ukraine, vol. 5 (1993)
  Profile of Volodar at hrono.ru

Year of birth missing
1124 deaths
Rurikids
Rostislavichi family
12th century in Kievan Rus'
Princes of Zvenyhorod